The Weekly Post is a weekly newspaper based in Locust, North Carolina covering Stanly County and southern Cabarrus County. The newspaper is owned by The Weekly Post, Inc.  The paper was established in 1974 by its editor and publisher John Long. Long died in 2003.

References

Weekly newspapers published in North Carolina
Stanly County, North Carolina
Cabarrus County, North Carolina